The following is a list of the tallest buildings in Atlantic City.

Casino hotels dominate the skyline and are interspersed with residential highrises. Prior to their construction following the legalization of gambling in the 1970s grand hotels, many built between the start of the 20th century and the Roaring Twenties, lined the Boardwalk, the first in the world. Since the 1980s, especially after the 2001 opening of the Brigantine Connector, the Marina District at the city's north end has seen much new development.

Tallest buildings

Timeline of tallest buildings

Old tallest buildings

See also
Casinos in Atlantic City
Gambling in New Jersey

References

External links

Atlantic City
Skyscrapers in Atlantic City, New Jersey
Towers in New Jersey
Tourist attractions in Atlantic County, New Jersey
Atlantic City